Yesterday and Today is the second studio album by Swedish electronic music producer Axel Willner under his alias The Field, released by Kompakt on 26 May 2009. The follow-up to his critically acclaimed debut From Here We Go Sublime, Yesterday and Today was recorded in one week in a deserted school on a Swedish island. "The More That I Do" was released as the album's lead single on 24 April 2009.

Featuring six tracks, Yesterday and Today has been described by Kompakt as "more organic than its predecessor." The album features a guest appearance by Battles drummer John Stanier on its title track, as well as a cover of The Korgis' "Everybody's Got to Learn Sometime".

Track listing

Charts

References

External links
 

2009 albums
The Field (musician) albums
Kompakt albums